Grant Morgan (born May 19, 1971, in Port Elizabeth, Cape Province) is a South African cricket coach and former cricketer who plays for Eastern Province and Northern Transvaal. He is right-hand wicket-keeper batsman.
He matriculated at Grey High School in Port Elizabeth.

He coached various team like South Africa national under-19 cricket team and Royal Challengers Bangalore as assistant coach and he was also KwaZulu Natal Inland cricket team as coach. He was appointed to take over coaching duties from Lance Klusener at Dolphin in May 2016.

References

External links
 
 

1971 births
Living people
South African cricketers
Eastern Province cricketers
Northerns cricketers
People from Port Elizabeth
South African cricket coaches
Indian Premier League coaches
Wicket-keepers